Jacob Kraus  (14 October 1861, Groningen – 24 August 1951, The Hague) was a Dutch hydraulic engineer, professor at the University of Santiago, Chile, and at Delft University of Technology and government minister of water management between 1905 and 1908.

1861 births
1951 deaths
Dutch engineers
Ministers of Transport and Water Management of the Netherlands
Liberal Union (Netherlands) politicians
Academic staff of the Delft University of Technology
Academic staff of the University of Santiago, Chile
People from Groningen (city)